Acacia Bay is a community on a small inlet on the western shores of Tapuaeharuru Bay, Lake Taupō in New Zealand. There are four main beach areas.  It is located approximately 2 miles west of Taupō.

Demographics

Acacia Bay had a population of 1,653 at the 2018 New Zealand census, an increase of 228 people (16.0%) since the 2013 census, and an increase of 420 people (34.1%) since the 2006 census. There were 660 households, comprising 825 males and 825 females, giving a sex ratio of 1.0 males per female. The median age was 50.8 years (compared with 37.4 years nationally), with 264 people (16.0%) aged under 15 years, 180 (10.9%) aged 15 to 29, 783 (47.4%) aged 30 to 64, and 420 (25.4%) aged 65 or older.

Ethnicities were 94.9% European/Pākehā, 9.8% Māori, 0.5% Pacific peoples, 1.8% Asian, and 1.8% other ethnicities. People may identify with more than one ethnicity.

The percentage of people born overseas was 18.0, compared with 27.1% nationally.

Although some people chose not to answer the census's question about religious affiliation, 53.4% had no religion, 37.7% were Christian, 0.4% had Māori religious beliefs, 0.2% were Muslim, 0.4% were Buddhist and 1.6% had other religions.

Of those at least 15 years old, 294 (21.2%) people had a bachelor's or higher degree, and 198 (14.3%) people had no formal qualifications. The median income was $39,600, compared with $31,800 nationally. 351 people (25.3%) earned over $70,000 compared to 17.2% nationally. The employment status of those at least 15 was that 678 (48.8%) people were employed full-time, 237 (17.1%) were part-time, and 27 (1.9%) were unemployed.

Activities
It has access to lakeside activities and is more protected from the prevailing wind than the eastern lake shore. The nearest major retail centre is Taupō and many would regard it as now a suburb of this service and resort town. From 31 October 2022 it had buses to Taupō on Mondays, Wednesdays and Thursdays. 

Acacia Bay is the location of the Tauhara Centre Trust, a retreat centre and pioneering centre in the revival of organic and biodynamic horticulture, which was moved to the site in 1977, and has proved historically to be attractive to overseas visitors. The trust has esoteric roots, having been founded in 1938 by amongst others, the widow of Dr. Robert Felkin, a noted member of the Stella Matutina Order and Order of the Golden Dawn.

Geology
The bay is on the western shores of the present outlet to Lake Taupō and has given its name to the 9210 BCE (11.4 ka) Acacia Bay Taupō Volcano Unit D eruption as the vent was nearby to the south-east and went on to form the  rhyolite Acacia Bay Dome behind the bay. This relatively small eruption produced the  dome  whose lava contains markers that identify some of the magma body involved as from a remelt of products from the Whakamaru Caldera eruption of 335,000 years ago. Behind this is an even higher scarp/terrace at about 60 to 90m above lake level that was formed after the 26,500 years ago Oruanui eruption when initially the new lake flowed out at Waihora   to the west. If you come into the bay from the north on the road from Taupo the flat shoreline before you reach the bay is post eruption mobilised  Hapete (Taupo) alluvium, with Hatepe (Taupo) ignimbrite and then Oruanui Ignimbrite covering the slope of the valley away from the lake. The northern promontory of the bay is formed from lava that erupted more than 100,000 years ago, with the township in the bay itself being built on deposits in the Huka Falls formation that also predated the Oruanui eruption eruption. Behind the bay and above the main road is the rhyolite of the Acaia Bay Dome.

References

Taupō District
Suburbs of Taupō
Populated places in Waikato
Populated places on Lake Taupō